Erich Raiet (until 1940 Freienthal; 16 January 1920 Venevere Parish – 25 April 1992 Tallinn) was an Estonian linguist.

In 1946 he graduated from Tartu University in Estonian philology. 1947–1992 he worked at Estonian SSR Academy of Sciences' Language and Literature Institute.

He was one of the authors and editors for several dictionaries of Standard Estonian.

Since 1939 he was a member of Mother Tongue Society.

Awards:
 1990: Wiedemann Language Award

Works

 Küsimusi eesti liitverbi alalt. // Eesti NSV TA Keele ja Kirjanduse Instituudi uurimused. I. Tallinn, 1956
 Nimisõnade nimetavalisest ja omastavalisest liitumisest. // KK (1958) 12
 Arnold Kask tänapäeva eesti kirjakeele viljelejana. // Emakeele Seltsi aastaraamat 18 (1972)
 Über die Zusammenstellung des Wörterbuches der estnischen Schriftssprache. // Congressus Tertius Internationalis Fenno-Ugristarum. I. Tallinn, 1975
 "Eesti kirjakeele sõnaraamat" ilmumisjärgus. // KK (1983) 3.

References

1920 births
1992 deaths
Linguists from Estonia
Linguists from the Soviet Union